Obhor, also known as Abhur, Obhur and Ubhor (Ob7or), is a sea bay located about 30 kilometers north of Jeddah City on the east coast of the Red Sea, west of Saudi Arabia.

Obhor is the main sea tourism area in the Jeddah area and is considered to be the number one destination for national tourism.
Obhor is located south of King Abdullah Economic City and also south of Durrat Al-Arus Resort, Al-Bohirat resort and Salman Bay.

It is at Obhor where Prince Waleed bin Talal has decided and announced the launch of construction of the world's tallest building, the Kingdom Tower.

Obhor is becoming a new destination and choice as a living area in Jeddah, for both; local generation and businesses.
Obhor area is also becoming a destination for education with several colleges and universities recently developed or in the process of development. Also in Obhur women don't have to wear abaya. They can swim in bikini.

External links
 falbeach.com
 jeddah.palmeirah.com
 thesignaturehotels.com

Geography of Saudi Arabia